Shola Aur Shabnam may refer to:
 Shola Aur Shabnam (1961 film), a Hindi film directed by Ramesh Saigal
 Shola Aur Shabnam (1992 film), a Hindi film directed by David Dhawan